Tropidoclonion is a genus of snake in the subfamily Natricinae of the family Colubridae. The genus is monotypic, containing the sole species Tropidoclonion lineatum, commonly known as the lined snake. The species is endemic to North America.

Common names
Additional common names for T. lineatum include common snake, dwarf garter snake, grass snake, line snake, ribbon snake, streaked snake, striped snake, and swamp snake.

Subspecies
Four subspecies are recognized as being valid, including the nominotypical subspecies.
Tropidoclonion lineatum annectens  – central lined snake
Tropidoclonion lineatum lineatum  – northern lined snake
Tropidoclonion lineatum mertensi  – Mertens' lined snake
Tropidoclonion lineatum texanum  – Texas lined snake

Nota bene: A trinomial authority in parentheses indicates that the subspecies was originally described in a genus other than Tropidoclonion.

Etymology
The subspecific name, mertensi, is in honor of German herpetologist Robert Mertens.

Geographic range
The lined snake is found throughout the central United States from Illinois to Texas.

Habitat
The preferred habitat of T. lineatum is grassland areas with soft, moist soils.

Description
The lined snake is olive green to brown with a distinctive tan or yellow stripe running down the middle of the back from head to tail. It has similar stripes, one down each side on scale rows 2 and 3. On the belly, it has a double row of clean-cut black half-moon spots running down the middle. It has a narrow head and small eyes.

Adult size is typically less than 35 cm (14 inches) in total length (including tail). However, maximum recorded total length is 53 cm (21 in).

The keeled dorsal scales are arranged in 19 rows at midbody. There are only 5 or 6 upper labials.

Behavior
The lined snake is semifossorial, spending most of its time hiding under rocks, leaf litter, logs, or buried in the soil.

Diet
The majority of the diet of T. lineatum consists of earthworms.

Reproduction
The lined snake is ovoviviparous, the young being born in August.  The average brood is seven or eight. The newborn juveniles are 10–12 cm (4-4¾ in.) long at birth.

References

Further reading
Behler JL, King FW (1979). The Audubon Society Field Guide to North American Reptiles and Amphibians. New York: Alfred A. Knopf. 743 pp.657 color plates. . (Tropidoclonion lineatum, pp. 677-678 + Plate 507).
Conant R, Bridges W (1939). What Snake Is That? A Field Guide to the Snakes of the United States East of the Rocky Mountains. (With 108 drawings by Edmond Malnate). New York and London: D. Appleton-Century. Frontispiece map + viii + 163 pp. + Plates A-C, 1-32. (Tropidoclonion lineatum, pp. 114–115 + Plate 21, Figure 63).
Hallowell E (1856). "Notice of a Collection of Reptiles from Kansas and Nebraska, presented to the Academy of Natural Sciences, by Dr. Hammond, U. S. A." Proc. Acad. Nat. Sci. Philadelphia 8: 238-253. (Microps, new genus, p. 240; Microps lineatus, new species, p. 241).
Powell R, Conant R, Collins JT (2016). Peterson Field Guide to Reptiles and Amphibians of Eastern and Central North America, Fourth Edition. Boston and New York: Houghton Mifflin Harcourt. xiv + 494 pp., 47 plates, 207 figures. . (Tropidoclonion lineatum, p. 433 + Plate 44).
Stebbins RC (2003). A Field Guide to Western Reptiles and Amphibians, Third Edition. The Peterson Field Guide Series ®. Boston and New York: Houghton Mifflin. xiii + 533 pp.  (paperback). (Tropidoclonion lineatum, p. 391 + Plate 50 + Map 168).
Wright AH, Wright AA (1957). Handbook of Snakes of the United States and Canada. Ithaca and London: Comstock Publishing Associates, a Division of Cornell University Press. 1,105 pp. (in 2 volumes) (Genus Tropidoclonion p. 879 + Figure 20, a-c, on p. 71; and species Tropidoclonion lineatum, pp. 879–884, Figure 252, Map 62).
Zim HS, Smith HM (1956). Reptiles and Amphibians: A Guide to Familiar American Species: A Golden Nature Guide. Revised Edition. New York: Simon and Schuster. 160 pp. ("Lined Snake", pp. 106, 156).

External links

Tropidoclonion at Oklahoma Snakes
Lined Snake, Reptiles and Amphibians of Iowa

Natricinae
Reptiles of the United States
Extant Pleistocene first appearances
Monotypic snake genera
Taxa named by Edward Drinker Cope